Chen In-chin is now a Taiwanese professor at National Central University. He was the Chairperson of Central Election Commission from 17 November 2017 to 25 November 2018.

Education and academic career
Chen obtained his bachelor's and master's degree in law from National Taiwan University in 1986 and 1992 respectively. He then obtained his doctoral degree in law from Heidelberg University in Germany in 1999.

Chen began teaching at Ming Chuan University as an assistant professor of law in 2000. He was promoted to associate professor in 2003. He left Ming Chuan University for National Central University (NCU) in 2006, and was appointed to the rank of full professor in 2008. He was the director of the Graduate Institute of Law and Government at NCU between 2015 and 2017.

Central Election Commission
Chen won 70 of 72 ballots in a Legislative Yuan vote in November 2017, confirming him to the chairmanship of the Central Election Commission. 

Chen believed he was impeached for his faithful implementation of Interpretation Nr. 748.  Interpretation No. 748 requires lawmakers to legalize same-sex marriage within two years, as long as it allows same-sex couples to get married, either by amending the Civil Code or enacting a special law, and if the Legislative Yuan has not completed amending the law by May 24, 2019, same-sex couples can register for marriage directly under the Civil Code.  Judicial Yuan President Hsu Tzong-li said "the result of the referendum cannot contradict the holdings of the Taiwan Constitutional Court" 。The Supreme Administrative Court ruling reveals that the Central Election Commission (CEC) has a "constitutional obligation to deliver a constitutional administrative act" by examining whether the referendum proposal complies with Interpretation of the Taiwan Constitutional Court. 

Former Ombudswoman Ms. Gau Fehng-Shian believed that "same-sex marriage is against public order and morality" ，and "the laws of men are no match for morality, much less for the law of Christ," she vowed to "become a wise overseer, making laws after God's will.  She invited representatives of religious groups to form the Taiwan Religious Alliance for Family Protection (TAFP) in 2013 to oppose gay marriage.  The Family Protection League and other groups opposing same-sex marriage formed the Next Generation Happiness Coalition (CHNG).  The leading proposer of the 12th national referendum, Tseng Hsien-Ying, is one member of the CHNG. 

During the referendum campaign, Ombudswoman Ms. Gau called Mr. Tseng and offered to help in any way she could.   
The Executive Yuan submitted updated submissions on October 29, 2018, clearly stating , if this ballot initiative is passed, the government will proceed to realize the right of same-sex marriage.  The supplemental submission annoyed Mr. Tseng. After reading the updated opinion, "many (anti-gay-marriage) people are now rumoring whether the 12th referendum is invalid, whether they should vote no (to this referendum)?" "Our (Mr. Tseng’s campaign) office has received over 250 phone calls per day from citizens asking if they should go to vote. How should they vote”.  On November 15, 2018, Mr. Tseng petitioned his case to Ombudswoman Ms. Gau, saying that the government’s position paper has "confused voters' judgment". Ms. Gau immediately sent two official letters to the CEC before the referendum, requesting accountability for the “confusion of voters judgement”. 
Chen resigned after the local election on 24 November 2018. On 7 November 2019, the Control Yuan voted to impeach Chen. The investigatory agency determined that the Organic Law of the Central Election Commission was violated during the 2018 Taiwanese referendum.

References

Living people
Heidelberg University alumni
National Taiwan University alumni
Political office-holders in the Republic of China on Taiwan
Year of birth missing (living people)
Taiwanese legal scholars
Taiwanese expatriates in Germany